Hofmann Tower is the name of a tower in Lyons, Illinois.  It was built in 1908 and was added to the National Register of Historic Places on December 22, 1978.

Hofmann Tower is featured prominently in two books written by Rose Marie Benedetti and Virginia C. Bulat entitled Lyons: A history of a village and area important for 300 years (1959) and Portage, pioneers, and pubs: A history of Lyons, Illinois (1963).

George Hofmann, Jr., a local brewer built a dam on the Des Plaines River to generate electricity. He also built the adjacent tower as part of a park that attracted visitors to picnic and ride boats.

In the 1970s, Rose Marie Benedetti and Maureen S. Kiener worked closely with the preservation efforts of the Village of Lyons Historical Commission to have Hofmann Tower designated a village and state landmark and placed on the National Register of Historic Places.

References

Towers completed in 1908
Buildings and structures in Cook County, Illinois
Buildings and structures on the National Register of Historic Places in Cook County, Illinois
History of Illinois
Park buildings and structures on the National Register of Historic Places in Illinois
1908 establishments in Illinois
Illinois State Historic Sites